Wanderlust is the seventh studio album by American country music group Little Big Town. It was released on June 10, 2016, through Capitol Nashville.

Background and composition
Little Big Town announced on May 24, 2016 that they would be releasing a new album. For the album the group collaborated with songwriter-producer, Pharrell Williams. The album came about after the group had a writing session with Williams in January 2016 that "turned into multiple writing sessions, as well as back and forth trips from Nashville to Los Angeles." They then wanted to share the music when they "realized it was too special not to share" with fans.

Karen Fairchild said, "It's not a country album [...] And it's not like anything we've ever done. It's fun to be spontaneous and put it out there to the fans, because we want to, and not to overthink it, but just because it has brought us a lot of joy, and we think it will for them as well. So why not? We're going with our gut and putting it out there. It's just music, you know?" Fairchild also stated that the band were working on a country album with Jay Joyce.

According to Pharrell Williams, singer Justin Timberlake also played a small role on the record by singing on "C'mon", the second song on the album. "We were in the same studio at the same time," Pharrell explained to Entertainment Tonight. "So we had Justin in one room, Little Big Town in another room. Quite naturally, people are going to visit each other, and Justin ended up singing on one of the songs."

Singles
"One of Those Days" was released on May 24, 2016 as the lead single from the album.

Track listing
Adapted from iTunes.
All tracks written by Karen Fairchild, Kimberly Schlapman, Jimi Westbrook, Phillip Sweet, and Pharrell Williams, unless otherwise noted.

Notes
"C'mon" features vocals from Justin Timberlake and Pharrell Williams.

Charts

Release history

References

2016 albums
Albums produced by Pharrell Williams
Albums produced by Chad Hugo
Capitol Records albums
Little Big Town albums
Albums produced by Justin Timberlake